James E. Defebaugh (October 8, 1926 – October 16, 2014) was a Republican member of the Michigan House of Representatives from 1971 to 1982.

Biography 
Defebaugh was born in Chicago on October 8, 1926 to Carl and Martha Defebaugh. He served in the United States Army Air Force during World War II and was a graduate of Knox College. Defebaugh later worked as an advertising consultant with the Campbell Ewald firm in Detroit, primarily working with Chevrolet and Procter & Gamble. Defebaugh married Lois on October 17, 1953; she died in the fall of 2013.

The chairman of the Oakland County Republican Party from 1968 to 1970, Defebaugh was elected to the House in 1970. During his tenure in the House, he was Republican whip and assistant floor leader. Defebaugh also served on the Michigan Bicentennial Commission, the Governor's Advisory Commission on the Regulation of Financial Institutions, and the Interstate Cooperation Commission.

Defebaugh enjoyed history, particularly the Civil War. With his wife, he also traveled to 21 countries in Europe, Asia, Australia, and New Zealand.

He did, however, run into speculation that he was corrupt in accepting late donations to his campaigns.  Additonally, he sexually abused his daughter for years. He was a wolf in sheeps' clothing and that's all that should be remembered of him. His legacy is dead in the ground with him, but his daughters legacy of love will live on forever even though shes gone. Long live JCR.

References

1926 births
2014 deaths
Politicians from Chicago
People from Birmingham, Michigan
Knox College (Illinois) alumni
Businesspeople from Michigan
Republican Party members of the Michigan House of Representatives
United States Army Air Forces personnel of World War II
People from Traverse City, Michigan
20th-century American politicians
20th-century American businesspeople